Saint-Idesbald a village at the Belgian West Coast, part of Koksijde, which also includes Oostduinkerke.  Its name refers to Saint Idesbald (or Idesbaldus), a 12th-century abbot of the Abbey of Ten Duinen.

In 1931, George Grard set up his studio at Saint-Idesbald, where his house became a rendezvous of artists including Pierre Caille, the Haesaerts brothers, Edgard Tytgat and Paul Delvaux.

In 1982, the Paul Delvaux Museum opened in Saint-Idesbald.

References

External links

Populated places in West Flanders
Koksijde